Abira is the creator god in the mythology of the Antioquia people of Colombia.

References
Probert Encyclopedia article on Abira

Creator gods
South American deities